Nesovtriton is an extinct genus of cryptobranchoid salamander known from the Late Cretaceous (Turonian age) of Bissekty Formation, in Uzbekistan. It was first named by Pavel P. Skutschas in 2009 and the type species is Nesovtriton mynbulakensis.

References

Cryptobranchoidea
Cretaceous salamanders
Late Cretaceous amphibians
Fossil taxa described in 2009
Fossils of Uzbekistan
Prehistoric amphibian genera